Robert Bennett (1831 – 5 October 1875) was an English cricketer. He was born at Tunbridge Wells in Kent.

Bennett made his first-class cricket debut for Sussex County Cricket Club against MCC at Lord's in 1860, in what was his only first-class appearance for Sussex. He later played for Kent, making his first-class debut for the county against England in 1863.  He made five further first-class appearances for Kent, the last of which came against England in 1864.  In his seven first-class appearances, he scored 35 runs at an average of 2.50, with a high score of 12, while as a wicket-keeper he took nine catches and made two stumpings.

He died at Chichester in Sussex on 5 October 1875 aged 43 or 44.

References

External links

1831 births
1875 deaths
People from Royal Tunbridge Wells
English cricketers
Sussex cricketers
Kent cricketers
Wicket-keepers